Adrian Blevins (born 1964 in Abingdon, Virginia, United States) is an American poet. Author of three collections of poetry, her most recent is Appalachians Run Amok, winner of the 2016 Wilder Prize (Two Sylvias Press, 2018). Her other full-length poetry collections are Live from the Homesick Jamboree (Wesleyan University Press, 2009) and The Brass Girl Brouhaha (Ausable Press, now Copper Canyon Press, 2003). With Karen McElmurray, Blevins recently co-edited Walk Till the Dogs Get Mean: Meditations on the Forbidden from Contemporary Appalachia (Ohio University Press, 2015), a collection of essays of new and emerging Appalachian poets, fiction writers, and nonfiction writers. Her chapbooks are Bloodline (Hollyridge Press, 2012)  and The Man Who Went Out for Cigarettes, which won the first of Bright Hill Press's chapbook contests. (Bright Hill Press, 1996).

Blevins won a Rona Jaffe Foundation Writers' Award in 2002. Other prizes include the Lamar York Prize for Nonfiction from the Chattahoochee Review, a Pushcart Prize for "Tally" from Appalachians Run Amok, and other magazine prizes from Ploughshares and Zone 3. She was a Walter Daken Poetry Fellow at the Sewanee Writers' Conference in 2008 and a Fellow at the Virginia Center for the Creative Arts in 2017.

Life
She is the granddaughter of Banner Blevins (1892-1972), who is known in outsider art circles for his sculpture garden in McCall's Gap, Virginia, and the daughter of Virginia Intermont College art professor and painter Tedd Blevins (1937-2007).

Her stepmother, Carole Blevins, is also a Virginia painter, and her stepfather, Jake Cress, is a Virginia cabinetmaker.

She graduated with a BA from Virginia Intermont College, a MA in Fiction from Hollins University, and a MFA in Poetry from Warren Wilson College in 2002.

She taught at Roanoke College, Hollins University, Sweet Briar College, and at Lynchburg College as the Thornton Wilder Fellow. She currently teaches at Colby College in Waterville, Maine and lives in East Winthrop, Maine.

Her poems have appeared in The American Poetry Review, Poetry, The Baffler, The Georgia Review, The Gettysburg Review, Copper Nickel, Crazyhorse, The Greensboro Review, The Southern Review, The Massachusetts Review, Ploughshares, and elsewhere. They have been reprinted in The Open Door One Hundred Poems, One Hundred Years of "Poetry" Magazine; Seriously Funny: Poems about Love, Death, Religion, Art, Politics, Sex, and Everything Else; From the Fishouse: An Anthology of Poems that Sing, Rhyme, Resound, Syncopate, Alliterate, and Just Plain Sound Great.

Awards

 2018 Wilder Prize, Two Sylvias Press
 2013 Pushcart Prize, Pushcart Prize XXXVII: Best of the Small Presses. 
 2012 Zone 3 Poetry Award.
 2010 Ploughshares Cohen Award for “The Waning.” 
 2007 Walter E. Daken Fellowship, Sewanee Writers' Conference
 2004 Kate Tufts Discovery Award for The Brass Girl Brouhaha
 2002 Rona Jaffe Foundation Writers' Award
 2000 Lamar York Prize for Nonfiction from The Chattahoochee Review
 1996 Bright Hill Press Chapbook Award for The Man Who Went Out for Cigarettes, which was reprinted in 1997

Bibliography

Poetry 
Collections
Appalachians Run Amok (Two Sylvias Press, 2018)
 Live from the Homesick Jamboree (Wesleyan University Press, 2009)
 
 Bloodline (Hollyridge Press, 2012)
 

List of poems

"Dear New Mothers of America", American Poetry Review
"Status Report", poets.org
"Memo", poets.org
"Dear Mothers of America", poets.org
"The Way She Figured He Figured It", poets.org
"Hey You", poets.org
"How to Cook a Wolf", Poetry, October 2008
"Novelette", Poetry, October 2005
"For My Students"; "Life History", The Drunken Boat
 "Love Poem for the Proles" on Poems from Here with Stuart Kestenbaum
 Audio: From the Fishouse > Adrian Blevins Reading Why the Marriage Failed
 Poem: The Poetry Foundation > from Poetry, October 2005 > Novelette by Adrian Blevins

Nonfiction 
Walk Till the Dogs Get Mean (Ohio University Press, 2015)
 "How Narrative Saved Me"
 "Nouns in Their Habitats"
 "Educating by Poetry"
 "Of Madmen and Spies"
 "Of Madmen and Spies", cont.
 "Of Madmen and Spies", cont.
 "In Praise of the Sentence", Poetry Foundation

Critical studies and reviews of Blevins' work
"Let Fly the Splendor", by Abigail Deutsch, Poetry Magazine

References

Living people
Poets from Virginia
Writers from Maine
Virginia Intermont College alumni
Hollins University alumni
Warren Wilson College alumni
Colby College faculty
Roanoke College faculty
1964 births
People from Abingdon, Virginia
People from Waterville, Maine
Rona Jaffe Foundation Writers' Award winners
21st-century American poets